Salomea of Poland (1211/1212 – 1268), also known as Salomea of Cracow or Blessed Salomea, (1211–1268) was a Polish princess and from 1215 to 1219 the Queen of Halych by virtue of being the wife of Kálmán or Coloman of Galicia.

Life
Salomea was the daughter of Leszek I the White, who was the Duke of Kraków and thus the High Duke in Poland, and his wife Grzymisława of Łuck (or Lutsk). She was the older sister of Bolesław V the Chaste. Her marriage to Kálmán, who was the son of King András or Andrew II of Hungary, was negotiated when she was about three.  Since her mother had ancestral connections to the lands of Galicia, and both her father and King Andrew wanted to dominate that area, this plan seemed to meet the needs of both parties. The marriage of Salomea and Kálmán, who was seven at the time, occurred in 1215. In 1219 their control in Galicia was ended and for a time they were taken as prisoners. After their release they returned to Hungary and lived in Szepes, now Spiš in the nation of Slovakia.

In 1226 Kálmán was named Duke of Slavonia by his father, and he took responsibility for the rule of Slavonia, Croatia, and Dalmatia.
He died in 1241 from wounds suffered at the Battle of Mohi during the Mongol invasion of Europe.

Salomea supported the Franciscans in Poland. In 1245 she joined the Order of Poor Ladies and founded a monastery in Zawichost in which to live as nuns according to the Rule of Saint Clare. Because of the danger of a Mongol invasion into Poland, Salomea and the other Poor Ladies moved westward from Zawichost in March 1257, and relocated to Skała, north of Kraków. Salomea was considered saintly and it was said that a star flew out of her mouth when she died. 

She was beatified in 1672 by Pope Clement X. Her tomb is in Kraków in a chapel within the Church of St. Francis of Assisi. She is also depicted in a stained glass window to the left of the main altar.

References

Sources

 

1210s births
1268 deaths
Polish beatified people
Piast dynasty
13th-century Polish nuns
Polish princesses
13th-century venerated Christians
Poor Clares
Franciscan beatified people